"Can We Talk"  is a song recorded by American R&B singer Tevin Campbell. It was written and produced by Babyface and Daryl Simmons and served as the first single to be released from Campbell's second studio album I'm Ready (1993). The song hit top ten on the pop charts peaking at number nine on the Billboard Hot 100 and spent a total of three weeks at number one on the US R&B chart. It sold 500,000 copies and earned a gold certification from the Recording Industry Association of America (RIAA). The song was also nominated for a Grammy Award for Best Male R&B Vocal Performance and won the Soul Train Music Award for Best R&B/Soul Single – Male.

Track listings

Notes
 denotes co-producer

Credits and personnel
Credits adapted from liner notes.

Tevin Campbell – lead and background vocals
Babyface – writer, composer, producer, all music and background vocals
Daryl Simmons – writer, composer and producer
Randy Walker – MIDI technician

Jim Zumpano, Donnell Sullivan – recording engineers
Rail Rogut, Steve Warner, Ulrich Wild – assistant engineers
Dave Way – mixing engineer
Ivy Skoff – production coordinator

Charts

Weekly charts

Year-end charts

Certifications

Code Red version 

The song was covered by many other artists, most successfully by British boyband Code Red in 1996 for their debut album Scarlet and was released as the first single in 1997, reaching number 29 on the UK Singles Chart.

Music video 
The music video shows that the members were dancing in a studio and there are scenes of how the band life in real life.

See also
List of number-one R&B singles of 1993 (U.S.)
List of number-one R&B singles of 1994 (U.S.)

References

Tevin Campbell songs
1993 songs
1993 singles
Songs written by Babyface (musician)
Songs written by Daryl Simmons
Song recordings produced by Babyface (musician)
Qwest Records singles
Polydor Records singles
1990s ballads
Contemporary R&B ballads